Lester Ford (born February 11, 1963) is an American serial killer and rapist who, from January to July 1991, assaulted four women and a young girl in Queens, New York, killing three of them. In 1992 Ford was sentenced to, and has been serving, a 40-year to life sentence ever since.

Early life 
Lester Ford was born on February 11, 1963, in the neighborhood of St. Albans in Queens, one of five siblings. In 1979, he was arrested after a botched drug deal, a crime for which he was later sent to prison for. Released in 1989, Ford began living a quiet life in his native neighborhood. He was nicknamed by neighbors as "Justice".

Murders 
On January 6, 1991, 36-year-old mother of two Sheilda Dixon dropped off her friend at Gethsemane Baptist Church in Hollis Park. While on her way, she stumbled into Ford, who proceeded to attack her, tape her mouth shut, and strangle her to death. Her body was later discovered at Peters Park baseball field on January 24. Over a month later, on February 23, 28-year-old Tracy Covington, a former social worker, was strangled to death outside her home by Ford a block and a half from where he had killed Dixon. In March, police in Queens became wary about the similarities in both killings and began speculating the possibility of a serial killer active in the city. In each case, the women were found with tape covering their mouths and their underwear had been pulled down to their ankles.

Ford emerged once again in St. Albans on July 4, when he raped a 16-year-old girl but did not kill her. On July 24, Ford attacked 20-year-old Sabrina Fost, who was eight months pregnant, just outside of her home as she was walking to the bus stop. Ford raped and shot Fost in the face. She did not die immediately and was rushed to the hospital, where she successfully delivered her baby Brian, however, Dixon died of her injuries shortly after. The day after attacking Dixon, Ford raped but did not kill, a 29-year-old woman.

Arrest and conviction 
On July 26, 1991, Ford was arrested after being positively identified by one of the rape victims. He was charged with the rape, and was additionally charged with the three murders. After his arrest, Ford's girlfriend confronted and beat one of Ford's surviving victims, threatening her if she testified. She was arrested. In March 1992, Ford accepted a plea agreement, confessing to his crimes, and was sentenced to 40 years to life in prison. He is serving his sentence at Elmira Correctional Facility.

See also 
 List of serial killers in the United States

External links 
 Inmate Population Information Search

References 

1963 births
1991 murders in the United States
20th-century American criminals
American male criminals
American people convicted of murder
American rapists
American serial killers
Crime in New York (state)
Criminals from New York (state)
Living people
Male serial killers
People convicted of murder by New York (state)
People from Queens, New York